Bhagwat Patel ( – 8 February 2020) was an Indian politician from Madhya Pradesh belonging to Bharatiya Janata Party. He was a legislator of the  Madhya Pradesh Legislative Assembly.

Biography
Patel was elected as a legislator of the Madhya Pradesh Legislative Assembly from  Betul 1990. He also contested from  Betul in 1993 but he was not elected in that election.

Singh died on 8 February 2020 at the age of 84.

References

1930s births
2020 deaths
People from Betul district
Bharatiya Janata Party politicians from Madhya Pradesh
Madhya Pradesh MLAs 1990–1992